Just Plain Mark and Zippy were two Radio Disney DJs that aired weekday afternoons at 4:00 ET. Both DJ’s were on at the same time and their show lasted till 8:00 PM ET. Mark (real name: Mark Sutherland) and Zippy (real name: Gary Wallace) broadcast from Tomorrowland at Disneyland. Both Just Plain Mark and Zippy became Radio Disney DJs in 1997 and retired in 2001.

The duo formed a group called I-8-Paste. Two songs were produced and can only be found on Radio Disney Jams 1 and 2. “I am Rubber” can be found on Jams 1 and "Let's Go" is on Jams 2. Although Just Plain Mark and Zippy did not appear anytime after, they hosted the launch party for Jams 3 at Disneyland in California.

References

External links
 Just Plain Mark and Zippy interview on mouseplanet.com

American radio personalities
Radio Disney DJs